Airton Moraes Michellon (born 29 May 1994), known simply as Airton, is a Brazilian footballer who currently plays as a goalkeeper for Chapecoense.

Career
Airton joined Red Bull Salzburg on the 1 July 2015 from Juventude.

Career statistics

Notes

References

External links

1994 births
Living people
Brazilian footballers
Brazilian expatriate footballers
Association football goalkeepers
Esporte Clube Juventude players
FC Red Bull Salzburg players
FC Liefering players
Red Bull Brasil players
Oeste Futebol Clube players
Esporte Clube Pelotas players
América Futebol Clube (MG) players
Austrian Football Bundesliga players
Campeonato Brasileiro Série B players
Campeonato Brasileiro Série C players
Campeonato Brasileiro Série D players
Brazilian expatriate sportspeople in Austria
Expatriate footballers in Austria
Sportspeople from Rio Grande do Sul